Canby is a city in Clackamas County, Oregon, United States. The population was 15,829 at the 2010 census.

History
Canby is named for Edward Richard Sprigg Canby, a Civil War general who was later killed in the Modoc War by Captain Jack and his group of warriors.

The area was known as Baker Prairie when the community was founded in 1857. Canby was platted in 1870. Canby was incorporated by the Oregon Legislative Assembly on February 15, 1893.

In May 2016, Canby was featured on the ABC newsmagazine 20/20, when the local "Canby Psychic" was part of an investigation into the swindling of a local rancher out of $15 million.

Geography

Entering Canby from the north brings visitors past the Willamette River, and from the south through the historic community of Aurora. The Molalla River passes by the southern and western border of the city.

Climate
This region experiences warm and dry summers, with no average monthly temperatures above .  According to the Köppen Climate Classification system, Canby has a warm-summer Mediterranean climate, abbreviated "Csb" on climate maps.

Demographics

2020 census 
As of the census of 2020, there were 18,171 people, and 6,498 households in the city. The average household size was 2.73 people. The population density was 3,867.82 inhabitants per square mile (1,493.50/km2). The racial makeup of the city was 87.0% White, 0.3% African American, 0.4% Native American, 1.8% Asian, 0.0% Pacific Islander, and 6.4% percent from two or more races. Hispanic or Latino of any race were 18.0% of the population.  

4.6% of the population were under 5 years of age, 25.4% were under 18 years of age, and 15.3% were over 65 years of age. The gender makeup of the city was 47.2% male, and 52.8% female.

2010 census
As of the census of 2010, there were 15,829 people, 5,647 households, and 4,129 families living in the city. The racial makeup of the city was 81.0% White, 0.6% African American, 1.2% Native American, 1.1% Asian, 0.2% Pacific Islander, 13.1% from other races, and 2.9% from two or more races. Hispanic or Latino of any race were 21.3% of the population. 

There were 5,647 households, of which 39.5% had children under the age of 18 living with them, 57.4% were married couples living together, 11.1% had a female householder with no husband present, 4.6% had a male householder with no wife present, and 26.9% were non-families. 22.3% of all households were made up of individuals, and 12.9% had someone living alone who was 65 years of age or older. The average household size was 2.79 and the average family size was 3.27.

The median age in the city was 36.3 years. 28.3% of residents were under the age of 18; 7.9% were between the ages of 18 and 24; 25.5% were from 25 to 44; 24% were from 45 to 64; and 14.2% were 65 years of age or older. The gender makeup of the city was 48.0% male and 52.0% female.

2000 census
As of the census of 2000, there were 12,790 people, 4,489 households, and 3,366 families living in the city. The population density was 3,390.0 people per square mile (1,309.9/km2). There were 4,743 housing units at an average density of 1,257.1 per square mile (485.8/km2). The racial makeup of the city was 88.42% White, 0.47% African American, 0.77% Native American, 1.00% Asian, 0.13% Pacific Islander, 7.47% from other races, and 1.74% from two or more races. Hispanic or Latino of any race were 15.52% of the population.

There were 4,489 households, out of which 40.6% had children under the age of 18 living with them, 60.3% were married couples living together, 10.4% had a female householder with no husband present, and 25.0% were non-families. Households made up of individuals represented 21.2% of all households, and 11.0% of all households had someone living alone who was 65 years of age or older. The average household size was 2.83 and the average family size was 3.27.

In the city, the population was spread out, with 30.6% under the age of 18, 8.5% from 18 to 24, 29.7% from 25 to 44, 19.7% from 45 to 64, and 11.6% who were 65 years of age or older. The median age was 33 years. For every 100 females, there were 95.1 males. For every 100 females age 18 and over, there were 91.4 males.

The median income for a household in the city was $45,811, and the median income for a family was $49,690. Males had a median income of $42,145 versus $28,775 for females. The per capita income for the city was $19,322. About 6.0% of families and 7.4% of the population were below the poverty line, including 9.3% of those under age 18 and 5.7% of those age 65 or over.

Arts and culture

The city's library is part of the Library Information Network of Clackamas County.

Canby is the home of the Clackamas County Fairgrounds, where the annual Clackamas County Fair and Rodeo has been held since 1907. The fairgrounds, located north of Oregon Route 99E, are used in August for the fair and year-round for other events.

Canby is home to the Canby Depot Museum and Hart's Reptile World.

Education
Canby students are served by the Canby School District, which includes Canby High School.

Media
The Canby Herald is the city's weekly newspaper. As of September 2018, Canby is also served by The Canby Current, a digital news source and twice-weekly podcast formerly known as the Canby Now Podcast.

Transportation

Rail
The Union Pacific (formerly a Southern Pacific mainline) freight and passenger (via Amtrak) line runs through the center of downtown Canby although Amtrak passenger trains no longer stop here. The Amtrak Cascades stops in nearby Oregon City. The Oregon Pacific Railroad branchline to Molalla interchanges with the Union Pacific mainline at Canby.

Mass transit
Since 2002, the city has operated its own bus system, Canby Area Transit (CAT). CAT buses do not run on weekends or major holidays. The service connects with the Portland area's TriMet at the Oregon City Transit Center and with the Salem-Keizer Transit (Cherriots) bus system in Woodburn.  Canby is also served by one route of South Metro Area Regional Transit (SMART), the bus division of the City of Wilsonville.  Prior to 2002, Canby was included within the TriMet district, and that agency was the sole provider of transit service in Canby.  In late 2001, TriMet approved a request by Canby to withdraw from the TriMet district and initiate its own transit service.

Automobile
Oregon Route 99E, a north–south highway, runs generally east–west within the city, paralleling the Union Pacific mainline. The Union Pacific mainline and Ivy St. form a cross that divides the city into four quadrants: NW, NE, SE and SW.

The east–west streets are generally numbered avenues, with Oregon Route 99E being SE and SW 1st Avenue. North–south streets are named streets. Many of their names are types of trees, and they run in alphabetical order from west to east, starting at the Molalla River. Within the city limits, addresses always include a quadrant designation, except for Ivy St, which only includes N or S.

Unincorporated islands within the city limits are included in the addressing system, as are some adjacent areas, but most unincorporated areas around the city but still in Clackamas County conform to the Portland addressing scheme, while areas in Marion County conform to the Salem addressing scheme.

Waterways
The historic Canby Ferry provides year-round transportation across the Willamette River (river conditions permitting) between Canby and Wilsonville.

Aviation
Canby is close to the Aurora State Airport and the Portland-Mulino Airport, both of which are served by general aviation only.

Pedestrian and bicycle
Canby features a paved road which is closed to automobile traffic, the Molalla Forest Road.  This road was formerly a private road used by logging trucks, but is now used primarily by bicyclists and pedestrians.

Notable people

 Jay Baller, baseball player
 Howard C. Belton, Oregon State Treasurer
 Ed Coleman, baseball player
 Ralph Coleman, baseball coach
 Tom Gorman, baseball pitcher
 Joni Harms, country musician
 Bill Morgan, football player
 Alan Olsen, Oregon State Senator
 Ralph Patt (1929–2010), the jazz-guitarist who introduced major-thirds tuning,  and also a geologist who consulted on groundwater contamination at the Hanford Site.
Kurt Schrader, U.S. Representative from Oregon
Martha Schrader, Oregon State Senator
Aaron E. Waite, Oregon Supreme Court justice

Sister city
 Kurisawa, Hokkaido, Japan (since 1987)

See also

References

External links
 City of Canby (official website)
 Entry for Canby in the Oregon Blue Book

 
Cities in Oregon
Cities in Clackamas County, Oregon
Portland metropolitan area
1870 establishments in Oregon
Populated places established in 1870
Populated places on the Willamette River